Anton Spelec, Sharp-Shooter is a Czech comedy film directed by Martin Frič. It was released in 1932.

Cast
 Vlasta Burian - Anton Spelec
 Růžena Šlemrová - Tereza
 Jaroslav Marvan - Kacaba
 Theodor Pištěk - Alois
 Jindřich Plachta - Kukacka
 Jirí Dréman - Chief of Sharpshooters
 Ella Nollová - Aunt Josefína
 Karel Postranecký - Rudolf's Friend
 František Kreuzmann - Vagabond
 Alexander Trebovský - Presiding Judge
 Čeněk Šlégl - Advocate
 Karel Schleichert - Member of Senate
 Viktor Nejedlý - Court Clerk
 Emanuel Hríbal - Court Attendant
 Ferdinand Jarkovský - Cellist

References

External links
 

1932 films
Czechoslovak comedy films
1932 comedy films
Czech black-and-white films
Czechoslovak black-and-white films
Films directed by Martin Frič
Czech comedy films
1930s Czech-language films
1930s Czech films